Lin Chia-hsing (born 13 July 1999) is a Taiwanese athlete specialising in the long jump. He represented his country at the 2019 World Championships in Doha without qualifying for the final. Additionally, he finished fourth at the 2019 Asian Championships.

His personal best in the event is 8.14 metres (+1.4 m/s) set in Taipei in 2019.

International competitions

References

1999 births
Living people
Taiwanese male long jumpers
World Athletics Championships athletes for Chinese Taipei